Leoš Heger (born 11 February 1948 in Hradec Králové) is a Czech doctor, university lecturer and politician. He was the Czech Minister of Health in the cabinet of Petr Nečas from July 2010 to July 2013.

Living people
Health ministers of the Czech Republic
1948 births
Politicians from Hradec Králové
Charles University alumni
TOP 09 Government ministers
Czech physicians
Czechoslovak physicians